Hein Phyo Win (born 19 September 1998) is a Burmese footballer who plays for Thai club Ratchaburi.

Club career

Early year
Hein Phyo Win was a product of Shan United Acedamy. In 2017, Shan United F.C. signed professional contract for Shan United Senior team. He became a wing-back player.

Shan United
In 2018, Shan United chose Hein Phyo Win for 2018 AFC Cup group stage against Ceres-Negros. He became a first line-up player when Shan United Senior players  decline their great form.

Ratchaburi F.C.
In July 2022, Hein Pyo Win signs with Ratchaburi, filling one of three ASEAN foreign players slot for the first half of 2022-23 Thai League 1 alongside Adam Reed and compatriot Myo Min Latt. He made his competitive debut on 13 August 2022, in the league game against Muangthong United, playing 90 minutes in a 1-0 victory.  On 11 September 2022, in a 1-1 draw against Police Tero F.C., he got his first red card after a bad tackle on Marc Landry Babo in the 49th minute.  He later got another two red cards in the match against Nakhon Ratchasima F.C. and Khon Kaen United.

International

Honours

Club
Shan United
 Myanmar National League winners: 2019; runners-up: 2018
 General Aung San Shield runners-up: 2019

External links
profile

References

1998 births
Living people
Sportspeople from Yangon
Burmese footballers
Myanmar international footballers
Shan United F.C. players
Hein Phyo Win
Hein Phyo Win
Association football defenders
Footballers at the 2018 Asian Games
Asian Games competitors for Myanmar